Wassaic may refer to:

Places
Wassaic, New York
Wassaic (Metro-North station), train station in Wassaic, New York

Ships
USS Wassaic (ID-3230), a United States Navy cargo ship in commission from 1918 to 1919